Subjectivity in a philosophical context has to do with a lack of objective reality. Subjectivity has been given various and ambiguous definitions by differing sources as it is not often the focal point of philosophical discourse. However, it is related to ideas of consciousness, agency, personhood, philosophy of mind, reality, and truth. Three common definitions include that subjectivity is the quality or condition of:
 Something being a subject, narrowly meaning an individual who possesses conscious experiences, such as perspectives, feelings, beliefs, and desires.<ref name=solomon>Solomon, Robert C. "Subjectivity," in Honderich, Ted. Oxford Companion to Philosophy (Oxford University Press, 2005), p.900.</ref>
 Something being a subject, broadly meaning an entity that has agency, meaning that it acts upon or wields power over some other entity (an object).
 Some information, idea, situation, or physical thing considered true only from the perspective of a subject or subjects.

The varying definitions of subjectivity are often used together and interchangeably. The term is most commonly used as an explanation for that which influences, informs, and biases people's judgments about truth or reality; it is the collection of the perceptions, experiences, expectations, and personal or cultural understanding of, and beliefs about, an external phenomenon, that are specific to a subject.

Subjectivity is contrasted to the philosophy of objectivity, which is described as a view of truth or reality that is free of any individual's biases, interpretations, feelings, and imaginings. Subjectivity and objectivity are usually seen as two directly opposing views; therefore, an understanding of one usually influences that of the other.

Philosophy

 Thinkers 
In Western philosophy, the idea of subjectivity is thought to have its roots in the works of Descartes and Kant though it could also come from Aristotle's work relating to the soul. The idea of subjectivity is often seen as a peripheral to other philosophical concepts, namely skepticism, individuals and individuality, and existentialism. The questions surrounding subjectivity have to do with whether or not people can escape the subjectivity of their own human existence and whether or not there is an obligation to try to do so. Important thinkers who focused on this area of study include Descartes, Locke, Kant, Hegel, Kierkegaard, Husserl, Foucault, Derrida, Nagel, and Sartre.Solomon, Robert C. "Subjective Truth," in Honderich, Ted. Oxford Companion to Philosophy (Oxford University Press, 2005), p. 900

Subjectivity was rejected by Foucault and Derrida in favor of constructionism, but Sartre embraced and continued Descartes' work in the subject by emphasizing subjectivity in phenomenology.Thomas, Baldwin. "Sartre, Jean-Paul," in Honderich, Ted. Oxford Companion to Philosophy (Oxford University Press, 2005). pp. 834–837 Sartre believed that, even within the material force of human society, the ego was an essentially transcendent being—posited, for instance, in his opus Being and Nothingness through his arguments about the 'being-for-others' and the 'for-itself' (i.e., an objective and subjective human being).

The innermost core of subjectivity resides in a unique act of what Fichte called “self-positing”, where each subject is a point of absolute autonomy, which means that it cannot be reduced to a moment in the network of causes and effects.

 Subjectivity applied 
One way that subjectivity has been conceptualized by philosophers such as Kierkegaard is in the context of religion. Religious beliefs can vary quite extremely from person to person, but people often think that whatever they believe is the truth. Subjectivity as seen by Descartes and Sartre was a matter of what was dependent on consciousness, so, because religious beliefs require the presence of a consciousness that can believe, they must be subjective. This is in contrast to what has been proven by science, which does not depend on the perception of people, and is therefore considered objective. Subjectivity is what relies on personal perception regardless of what is proven or objective.

Many philosophical arguments within this area of study have to do with moving from subjective thoughts to objective thoughts with many different methods employed to get from one to the other along with a variety of conclusions reached. This is exemplified by Descartes deductions that move from reliance on subjectivity to somewhat of a reliance on God for objectivity.Cottingham, John. "Descartes, René," in Honderich, Ted. Oxford Companion to Philosophy (Oxford University Press, 2005), p. 201–205. Foucault and Derrida denied the idea of subjectivity in favor of their ideas of constructs in order to account for differences in human thought. Instead of focusing on the idea of consciousness and self-consciousness shaping the way humans perceive the world, these thinkers would argue that it is instead the world that shapes humans, so they would see religion less as a belief and more as a cultural construction.

Others like Husserl and Sartre followed the phenomenological approach. This approach focused on the distinct separation of the human mind and the physical world, where the mind is subjective because it can take liberties like imagination and self-awareness where religion might be examined regardless of any kind of subjectivity. The philosophical conversation around subjectivity remains one that struggles with the epistemological question of what is real, what is made up, and what it would mean to be separated completely from subjectivity.

Sociology
Subjectivity is an inherently social mode that comes about through innumerable interactions within society. As much as subjectivity is a process of individuation, it is equally a process of socialization, the individual never being isolated in a self-contained environment, but endlessly engaging in interaction with the surrounding world.
Culture is a living totality of the subjectivity of any given society constantly undergoing transformation. Subjectivity is both shaped by it and shapes it in turn, but also by other things like the economy, political institutions, communities, as well as the natural world.

Though the boundaries of societies and their cultures are indefinable and arbitrary, the subjectivity inherent in each one is palatable and can be recognized as distinct from others. Subjectivity is in part a particular experience or organization of reality, which includes how one views and interacts with humanity, objects, consciousness, and nature, so the difference between different cultures brings about an alternate experience of existence that forms life in a different manner. A common effect on an individual of this disjunction between subjectivities is culture shock, where the subjectivity of the other culture is considered alien and possibly incomprehensible or even hostile.

Political subjectivity is an emerging concept in social sciences and humanities. Political subjectivity is a reference to the deep embeddedness of subjectivity in the socially intertwined systems of power and meaning.  "Politicality", writes Sadeq Rahimi in Meaning, Madness and Political Subjectivity, "is not an added aspect of the subject, but indeed the mode of being of the subject, that is, precisely what the subject is."

See also

 Dogma
 Intersubjectivity
 Phenomenology (philosophy)
 Phenomenology (psychology)
 Political subjectivity
 Q methodology
Relativism
 Subject (philosophy)
 Transcendental subjectivity
 "Subjectivity is Truth", an existential interpretation of subjectivity by Søren Kierkegaard
 Self
 Vertiginous question

References

Further reading
 Beiser, Frederick C. (2002). German Idealism: The Struggle Against Subjectivism, 1781–1801. Harvard University Press.
 Block, Ned; Flanagan, Owen J.; & Gzeldere, Gven (Eds.) The Nature of Consciousness: Philosophical Debates. Cambridge, MA: MIT Press.  
 Bowie, Andrew (1990). Aesthetics and Subjectivity : From Kant to Nietzsche. Manchester: Manchester University Press.
 Dallmayr, Winfried Reinhard (1981). Twilight of Subjectivity: Contributions to a Post-Individualist Theory Politics. Amherst, MA: University of Massachusetts Press.
 Ellis, C. & Flaherty, M. (1992). Investigating Subjectivity: Research on Lived Experience. Newbury Park, CA: Sage.  
 Farrell, Frank B. (1994). Subjectivity, Realism, and Postmodernism: The Recovery of the World in Recent Philosophy. Cambridge - New York: Cambridge University Press.
Gaukroger, Stephen. (2012). Objectivity. Oxford University Press.
 
 Lauer, Quentin (1958). The Triumph of Subjectivity: An Introduction to Transcendental Phenomenology''. Fordham University Press.

External links

Concepts in metaphilosophy
Concepts in metaphysics
Concepts in the philosophy of mind
Concepts in the philosophy of science
Metaphysical theories
Metaphysics of mind
Ontology
Philosophy of psychology
Political philosophy
Sociological theories
Subjective experience